KPBR may refer to:

 KPBR (FM), a radio station (91.7 FM) licensed to Poplar Bluff, Missouri, United States
 KWMY, a radio station (105.9 FM) licensed to Joliet, Montana, United States, which held the call sign KPBR from 2006 to 2009